Janis Owens (born 1960 in Marianna, Florida) is an American author. She has written four novels and one cookbook. American Ghost, her latest novel, was published in 2013.

Early life and education
Owens is a native of North Florida, born a few miles south of the Alabama/Georgia border in the town of Marianna. She was the last child and only daughter of an Assemblies of God preacher, Roy Johnson, and his wife, Martha Johnson.

When she was a toddler, her father gave up the ministry and became an insurance salesman. From Marianna, the family moved to New Orleans, then Hattiesburg, Mississippi, then to finally back to North Florida. They eventually ended up in Ocala, which is where she spent the remainder of her childhood.

Shortly after graduating high school she married Wendel Owens, a native of Arkansas. In 1983, after the birth of her first daughter, Owens graduated from the University of Florida.

Career
After graduating from college, Owens began writing her first novel, My Brother Michael. The novel is set in Marianna, Florida, where she spent her early childhood. She says she "finished in due time...it was received well enough, considering it was a first novel and I was a twenty-four year old half-wit at the time." My Brother Michael relates the story of Gabriel Catts and his lifelong love for his brother's wife, Myra.

Owens then wrote Myra Sims, which tells the story from Myra's perspective. The Schooling of Claybird Catts, Owens' third novel, brings the story full circle and carries it into the next generation.

Owens most recent novel, due for publication October 2013, is "American Ghost" (Scribner.)

Cracker roadshow
Another project of hers is the "Cracker Roadshow", which she describes thusly:

Works
My Brother Michael
Myra Sims
The Schooling of Claybird Catts
The Cracker Kitchen (2009)
American Ghost'

See alsoCracker'', a pejorative term
Florida cracker

References

External links
Janis Owens' Amazon Author Page

Living people
1960 births
Novelists from Florida
21st-century American novelists
American women novelists
People from Marianna, Florida
University of Florida alumni
21st-century American women writers